The 2012 VIVA World Cup was an international football tournament held in Iraqi Kurdistan from 4–9 June 2012. The 9 national teams involved in the tournament were required to register a squad of players; only players in these squads were eligible to take part.
 
Players' club teams as of 3 June 2012 – the tournament's opening day.

Group A

Kurdistan
Coach:  Abdullah Mahmud

Occitania
Coach:  Didier Amiel

Western Sahara
Coach:  Sidahmed Erguibi Ahmed Baba Haiai

Group B

Zanzibar
Coach:  Hemed Suleiman

Raetia
Coach:  Ursin Caviezel.

Tamil Eelam
Coach:  Ragesh Nambiar

Group C

Northern Cyprus
Coach:  Firat Canova

Provence
Coach:  Philippe Burgio

Darfur
Coach:  Mark Hodson

References
1. https://web.archive.org/web/20120606210859/http://www.faraetia.ch/news.php
2. http://www.tamilguardian.com/article.asp?articleid=4966
3. http://www.ktff.org/Anasayfa
4. https://archive.today/20130415154550/http://www.prouvenco-football.org/index.php/actualites/78-une-victoire-pour-le-1er-match-de-la-selection-provencale
5. http://darfurunited.com/team/

Viva World Cup
Association football tournament squads